The Boeing 720 is an American narrow-body airliner produced by Boeing Commercial Airplanes.

Announced in July 1957 as a 707 derivative for shorter flights from shorter runways, the 720 first flew on November 23, 1959.
Its type certificate was issued on June 30, 1960, and it entered service with United Airlines on July 5, 1960. A total of 154 Boeing 720s and 720Bs were built until 1967.
As a derivative, the 720 had low development costs, allowing profitability despite few sales.

Compared to the 707-120, it has a length reduced by 8.33 feet (2.54 m), a modified wing and a lightened airframe for a lower maximum takeoff weight. Originally designed to be powered by four Pratt & Whitney JT3C turbojets, the initial 720 would cover a  range with 131 passengers in two classes.

The reconfigured 720B, powered by JT3D turbofans, first flew on October 6, 1960, and entered service in March 1961.
It could seat 156 passengers in one class over a  range. Some 720s were later converted to 720Bs specification.

It was succeeded by the Boeing 727 trijet. The 720 is the only Boeing-designed production jetliner that does not follow the "7x7" naming scheme.

Development

Shorter range 707

Boeing announced its plans to develop a new version of the 707 in July 1957. The model was originally designated 707-020 before being changed to 720 at the input of United Airlines.

The new model was designed to a lower maximum takeoff weight with a modified wing and a lightened airframe. The wing modifications included Krueger flaps outboard of the outboard engines, lowering take-off and landing speeds—thus shortening runway length requirements—and a thickened inboard leading edge section, with a slightly greater sweep. It had four Pratt & Whitney JT3C-7 turbojet engines producing  each.

Because the aircraft systems were similar to the Boeing 707, no prototype Boeing 720 was built; any different systems were tested on the Boeing 367-80. The first 720 took its maiden flight on November 23, 1959. The type certificate for the 720 was issued on June 30, 1960. It first entered service with United Airlines on July 5, 1960; 65 of the original version were built.

Further developments
The 720B version of the 720 had JT3D turbofan engines, producing  each. The JT3D engines had lower fuel consumption and higher thrust. The 720B first took to the skies on October 6, 1960, and received certification and entered service with American Airlines in March 1961; 89 720Bs were built, in addition to conversions of American's 10 existing 720s.

As a modification of an existing model, the 720 had minimal research and development costs, which allowed it to be successful despite few sales. The company built 154 Boeing 720s and 720Bs from 1959 to 1967. The 720's wing modification was later added on the 707-120B and on 707-120s retrofitted to the B standard.

Design

The Boeing 720 is a four-engined low-wing cantilever monoplane.

Fuselage
The rearmost of the 707's over-wing emergency exits was deleted on each side, which reduced passenger capacity, while two over-wing exits were an option for higher-density configurations.

Wings
The 720 uses an improved wing based on the 707 wing. For the 720, the wing was changed between the fuselage and inner engines by adding a wing root glove. This glove reduced the drag of the wing by decambering the root, which reduced the "middle effect", thereby increasing the effective local wing sweep. The wing root glove reportedly increased the drag divergence Mach number of the wing by Mach 0.02.

Engines
Though initially fitted with turbojet engines, the dominant engine for the Boeing 720 was the Pratt & Whitney JT3D, a turbofan variant of the JT3C with lower fuel consumption and higher thrust. JT3D-engined 720s had a "B" suffix; some of American's 720Bs were conversions of JT3C-powered 720s.

Like the 707, the 720/720B used engine-driven turbocompressors to supply high-pressure air for cabin pressurization. The engines could not supply sufficient bleed air for this purpose without a serious loss of thrust. The small air inlets and associated humps are visible just above the main engine inlets on the two inner engine pods of all 720s and 720Bs; the lack of the turbocompressor inlet on the outer starboard pod (number 4 engine) helps spotters distinguish 720/720Bs from most 707s, which had three turbocompressors.

Other equipment
The Boeing 720 lacked an auxiliary power unit, and relied instead on ground power and pneumatic air to power the aircraft's systems, provide air conditioning, and start the engines while on the ground. The normal practice for Boeing 720 aircraft was to start the number three (inner starboard) engine first, then disconnect ground power and air. With one engine running, bleed air from that engine could be used to provide necessary air pressure to start the other engines one by one. On ground, with ground starting crew at hand, all four engines were usually started with ground crew help: this was more reliable and faster.

Operational history

The first aircraft was a production aircraft for United Airlines which flew on November 23, 1959. The type certificate for the 720 was issued on June 30, 1960. The first service of the 720 was by United Airlines on July 5, 1960 on the Los Angeles-Denver-Chicago route. American Airlines followed by putting the 720 in commercial operation on July 31 that same year.

The 720 was supplanted by the Boeing 727 in the mid-1960s in its medium-range, high-performance market. In the late 1960s, 720 and 720B aircraft were used by the US military to shuttle troops to the Far-East war efforts. The interiors of these planes were stripped of class partitions. Some of these flights originated at Travis AFB California and flew nonstop to Japan. At least one of the landing sites was Yokota AB, Japan, before the troops traveled to their final destinations.

After disposal of 720s by the major airlines, many were acquired by second-rank operators in South America and elsewhere.

In 1984, a Boeing 720 flown by remote control was intentionally crashed at Edwards AFB as a part of the FAA and NASA Controlled Impact Demonstration program. The test provided peak accelerations during a crash. The performance of fire-retardant fuel was also tested.

The first 720 (N7201U) was later renamed "The Starship" and became a private charter jet used mainly by touring rock bands. Its main user was Led Zeppelin in the 1970s. The seating capacity was reduced and a bar with a built-in electric organ was added, along with beds, a shower, a lounge area, a TV, and video cassette player.

Honeywell operated the last Boeing 720 in the United States, flying out of Sky Harbor Airport in Phoenix. The aircraft had been modified with an extra engine nacelle mounted on the right side of the fuselage to allow testing of a turbine engine at altitude, operating on special certification allowing it to be used for experimental use. This 720B was scrapped on June 21 and 22, 2008. Honeywell replaced their aircraft with a Boeing 757.

Pratt & Whitney Canada (PWC) operated the last flying 720 (C-FETB) until 2010. C-FETB was built as N7538A in 1960 and was initially flown by American Airlines and later by Middle East Airlines as OD-AFQ. It was purchased by PWC in December 1985 and between October 1986 and January 1988 it was modified for use as a flying engine test bed. Internally it was known as FTB1 (Flying Test Bed 1). C-FETB was used to test a variety of engines with it being capable of carrying a large turbofan in place of the right wing’s inner engine. Alongside this a small turbofan could be mounted on the right side of the front fuselage while a turboprop could be mounted in the modified nose. Its final operational flight occurred on September 29, 2010. Pratt & Whitney Canada replaced the testbed with a Boeing 747SP. In May 2012, the former PWC 720 was flown to CFB Trenton, Ontario, to be put on display at the National Air Force Museum of Canada.

Variants
720
First production variant with four Pratt & Whitney JT3C turbojet engines
Several high-density seat configurations delivered to Eastern Airlines included four over-wing escape hatches and brake cooling fans to effect quick turns on short-haul sectors. These aircraft, designated "720-025", were certificated to carry up to 170 passengers, provided that certain safety requirements were met.

720B
Improved variant with four Pratt & Whitney JT3D turbofan engines; American Airlines converted its 720s to 720B standard.

Operators
These operators flew Boeing 720/720Bs (● = Original Operators):

Accidents and incidents

The Boeing 720 has had 23 hull-loss accidents during its career; it was also involved in a number of incidents including nine hijack incidents and one aircraft destroyed by a bomb in mid-air in 1976. Only 12 of the hull-loss accidents included fatalities which totaled 175 deaths in addition to the 81 deaths on the aircraft destroyed in mid-air by a bomb.

The worst accidents were:
 On February 12, 1963, Northwest Orient Airlines Flight 705, a Boeing 720-051B (reg. N724US), suffered an in-flight break-up over the Florida Everglades about 12 minutes after leaving Miami, bound for Chicago. All 35 passengers and eight crew died. The cause of the crash was determined to be an unrecoverable loss of control due to severe turbulence.
 On May 20, 1965, Pakistan International Airlines Flight PK 705, 720-040B (reg AP-AMH), crashed short of the runway at Cairo International Airport, killing 121 of the 127 people on board.
 On December 8, 1972, seven members of the Eritrean Liberation Front hijacked Ethiopian Airlines Flight 708, a Boeing 720-060B, on its way to Paris. Security forces on the plane immediately opened fire, killing all but one of the hijackers (the last surviving hijacker later died in hospital). During the altercation, a hand grenade was detonated that damaged control cables under the cabin floor. However, the pilot put the plane into a controlled dive and managed to land the plane safely back in Addis Ababa with no further casualties.
 On January 1, 1976, Middle East Airlines Flight 438, a Boeing 720-023B (reg. OD-AFT), was destroyed en-route from Beirut to Dubai by a bomb in the forward cargo hold. All 66 passengers and 15 crew were killed.

Aircraft on display
 720-051B 18351 "Chung Mei", a former Republic of China Air Force VIP aircraft, is on display at Kangshan, Taiwan.
720-047B AP-AXL is on display at PIA Planetarium, Lahore (Pakistan) standing in a park for the public.
720-047B AP-AXM is on display at PIA Planetarium, Karachi (Pakistan).
720-023B C-FETB was donated to the National Air Force Museum of Canada in 2012 after its last flight.
720-030B HK-749 is on display at Museo de los Niños (Children's Museum of Bogotá), Bogotá, Colombia in Avianca Colombia livery. It was the first jet airplane delivered to a Colombian airline.

Specifications

See also

References

Notes

Bibliography

Further reading

 
 Caidin, Martin. Boeing 707. New York: Bantam Books, 1959.
 Price, Alfred. The Boeing 707. Leatherhead, Surrey, UK: Profile Publications, 1967.
 Schiff, Barry J. The Boeing 707. Blue Ridge Summit, PA: Tab Books, 1982, First edition 1967, . .
 Whittle, John A. The Boeing 707 and 720. Tonbridge, Kent: Air Britain (Historians), 1972. .
 
 Lloyd, Alwyn T. Boeing 707 & AWACS in Detail and Scale. Falbrook, CA: Aero Publishers, 1987. .
 
 Cook, William H. Road to the 707: The Inside Story of Designing the 707. Bellevue, WA: TYC Publishing Company, 1991. .
 Cearley, George Walker. Boeing 707 & 720: A Pictorial History. Dallas, TX: G.W. Cearley Jr, 1993. No ISBN.
 Smith, Paul Raymond. Boeing 707 – Airline Markings No. 3. Shrewsbury, Shropshire, UK: Swan Hill Press, 1993. .
 
 Wilson, Stewart. Boeing 707, Douglas DC-8, and Vickers VC-10. Fyshwick, Australia, ACT: Aerospace Publications Pty Ltd., 1998. 1-875671-36-6.
 Francillon, René. Boeing 707: Pioneer Jetliner. Shrewsbury, Shropshire, UK: Motor Books International, 1999. 
 
 
 Winchester, Jim. Boeing 707. Shrewsbury, Shropshire, UK: Airlife, 2002. .
 Stachiw, Anthony L. and Andrew Tattersall. Boeing CC137 (Boeing 347C) in Canadian Service. St. Catherines, ON: Vanwell Publishing Ltd., 2004. .
 Breffort, Dominique. Boeing 707, KC-135 and Civilian and Military Versions. Paris: Histoire & Collections, 2008. .

720
1950s United States airliners
Quadjets
Boeing 707
Low-wing aircraft
Aircraft first flown in 1959